Artie Shaw: Time Is All You've Got is a 1985 Canadian documentary film about clarinetist Artie Shaw. It was written, directed and narrated by Brigitte Berman.

Accolades
At the 59th Academy Awards in 1987, it won the Academy Award for Best Documentary Feature, tying with Down and Out in America.

References

External links

FilmAffinity
AllMovie

1985 films
Canadian documentary films
Best Documentary Feature Academy Award winners
Documentary films about jazz music and musicians
1985 documentary films
1980s English-language films
1980s Canadian films